Annelies Dom (born 8 April 1986) is a Belgian former professional racing cyclist, who rode professionally between 2013 and 2020 for the  and  teams. Dom now works as a directeur sportif for UCI Women's Continental Team .

Major results

2013
 3rd Time trial, National Road Championships
2014
 10th Erondegemse Pijl
2015
 9th Cholet Pays de Loire Dames
2016
 9th Overall Tour de Bretagne Féminin
2018
 1st  Road race, National Road Championships
 1st  Points race, National Track Championships
 3rd Omloop van de IJsseldelta
2019
 3rd Time trial, National Road Championships
 9th Nokere Koerse

See also
 List of 2015 UCI Women's Teams and riders

References

External links

1986 births
Living people
Belgian female cyclists
Place of birth missing (living people)
21st-century Belgian women